Guardian is a Malayalam thriller film, directed by Satheesh Paul and starring Saiju Kurup and Miya George. Guardian was released on 1 January 2021 on Prime Reels, one of the first four released on the OTT platform.

Plot
Shruthi is the daughter of a well known businessman. She attempts to commit suicide due to love failure and Dr.Arun treats her and they both become good friends. They decide to marry each other. Both of them start to live a happy life when a person blackmails her that he has her intimate pictures. The rest of the movie revolves around police trying to solve the case.

Cast

References

External links 
 

2020s Malayalam-language films
2021 films
2021 thriller films
Indian thriller films